Argyrosomus is a genus of fish in the drum family, Sciaenidae. They are large fish, with the largest, A. regius, growing up to 230 cm in length. They are commonly targeted as game fish.

Amoy croaker, Argyrosomus amoyensis (Bleeker, 1863) 
Argyrosomus beccus Sasaki, 1994 
Dusky kob, Argyrosomus coronus Griffiths and Heemstra, 1995
Arabian sea meagre, Argyrosomus heinii (Steindachner, 1902)
Madagascar meagre, Argyrosomus hololepidotus (Lacepède, 1801)   
Mild meagre, silver kob, Argyrosomus inodorus Griffiths and Heemstra, 1995 
Mulloway, Argyrosomus japonicus (Temminck and Schlegel, 1843) 
Meagre, Argyrosomus regius (Asso, 1801)
Squaretail kob, Argyrosomus thorpei Smith, 1977

References

 
 

Sciaenidae
Perciformes genera